Walter Saúl Andrade (born 1 December 1984) is a retired Argentine professional footballer who played as a centre-back.

Career
Andrade started his senior career with Sportivo Urquiza in 2002 in the regional leagues, prior to joining Torneo Argentino B's Atletico Hernandarias in 2004. A year later, Andrade joined fellow Torneo Argentino B side Patronato. In his first three seasons with the club, he made sixty-one appearances and scored four goals. Patronato were promoted to Torneo Argentino A in 2008, where they remained until 2010 when they were promoted to Primera B Nacional. Andrade made his professional debut on 4 September 2010 versus Rosario Central, before scoring his first pro goal in February 2011 against San Martín.

At the conclusion of the 2015 Primera B Nacional season, Patronato were promoted to the Argentine Primera División; Andrade had scored nine goals in one hundred and ninety matches in six Primera B Nacional campaigns. He subsequently made thirty-five appearances in his first two seasons in the Primera División, scoring one goal in a draw with Aldosivi on 9 December 2016. Including local Liga Paranaense matches, Andrade has made over 400 appearances for Patronato.

On 30 June 2020, Andrade announced his retirement from football.

Honours
Patronato
Torneo Argentino B: 2007–08
Torneo Argentino A: 2009–10

References

External links

1984 births
Living people
People from Paraná, Entre Ríos
Argentine footballers
Association football defenders
Torneo Argentino B players
Torneo Argentino A players
Primera Nacional players
Argentine Primera División players
Club Atlético Patronato footballers
Sportspeople from Entre Ríos Province